Daniel Gimeno-Traver successfully defended his title, defeating Tommy Robredo 6–3, 6–2 in the final.

Seeds

Draw

Finals

Top half

Bottom half

References
 Main draw
 Qualifying draw

2012
Singles